Connie Briscoe (born December 31, 1952) is an American writer of romantic and historical fiction. Briscoe's first novel, Sisters and Lovers (1994), sold nearly 500,000 copies in cloth and paperback combined in its first two years.

Darryl Dickson-Carr has characterized Briscoe as "among the better writers to emerge in and benefit from the strong wave of interest in African American fiction that arose in the early 1990s after the publication of Terry McMillan's Waiting to Exhale (1992)."

Early life and education
Constance Briscoe was born in Washington, D.C. on December 31, 1952. She was born with a hearing impairment due to a genetic condition and became profoundly deaf by the age of thirty, though she became adept at lip-reading. Briscoe grew up in the Silver Spring, Maryland area.

She attended Hampton University, graduating with a bachelor's degree in 1974, and American University, graduating with a Master of Public Administration degree in 1978.

Career
Briscoe worked as a research analyst from 1976 to 1980, then as an editorial assistant for Joint Center for Political and Economic Studies from 1981 to 1990. From 1990 to 1994, she worked as the managing editor for American Annals of the Deaf, an academic journal published by Gallaudet University Press. While at Gallaudet, she learned American Sign Language and was immersed in deaf culture for the first time. Briscoe wrote her first novel, Sisters and Lovers, while working for Gallaudet; that story focuses on the dating experiences of three young black sisters. After the success of that novel, she shifted to working full-time as a writer. Her second book, Big Girls Don't Cry, was published in 1996, with a story about a young, middle-class black woman entering the business world during the 1960s and 1970s. In 1996, Newsweek columnist Malcolm Jones Jr. wrote that Briscoe was one of several authors who were writing in "a new literary genre", one focusing on upbeat stories about contemporary black women.

Works
 Sisters and Lovers, Harper Collins, New York, 1994  
 Big Girls Don't Cry, Harper Collins, New York, 1996,  
 A Long Way from Home, Harper Collins, New York, 1999,    
 P. G. County, Doubleday, New York, 2002,   
 Can't get enough, Doubleday, New York, 2005,  
 You Only Get Better: Celebrating Life Every Step of the Way, Kimani Press, New York, 2007  
 Jewels: 50 Phenomenal Black Women Over 50, Little Brown and Company, New York, 2007   
 Sisters and Husbands, Grand Central Publishers, New York, 2009   
 Money Can't Buy Love, Grand Central Publishers, New York, 2011,

Awards
In 2000, Briscoe was honored by Gallaudet University with the Amos Kendall Award, "presented to a deaf person in recognition of his or her notable excellence in a professional field not related to deafness". Her third book, A Long Way From Home, was nominated for the NAACP Image Awards.

References

1952 births
Living people
American historical novelists
American romantic fiction novelists
African-American novelists
American women novelists
Hampton University alumni
American University alumni
American deaf people
21st-century African-American people
21st-century African-American women
20th-century African-American people
20th-century African-American women
African-American women writers